(shortened STAPO) was from 1941 to 1945 a National Socialist armed police force that consisted of Norwegian officials after Nazi German pattern. It operated independently of the ordinary Norwegian police. The force was established on 1 June 1941 during the German occupation of Norway. The initiative for the force came from the later chief Karl Marthinsen and other prominent members of the collaborationist party Nasjonal Samling. At its peak, in 1944 there were 350 employees in Statspolitiet, in addition to a larger number who collaborated or rendered services for them.

Description 
Its purpose was primarily to combat so-called political crimes, refugees, espionage, sabotage, armed resistance and other kinds of resistance against the German occupation forces or the Norwegian collaborationist Quisling regime. Statspolitiet played an important role during the Holocaust in Norway, aiding in the deportation of the Jews in Norway. Norwegians were arrested by contemporary laws, and many were later sent to prison camps in Norway and concentration camps in what was then Germany. Statspolitiet was organized with a headquarters in Oslo and six subsidiaries in Oslo and Aker, Stavanger, Bergen, Trondheim, Tromsø and Kirkenes. Statspolitiet was subordinate to the chief of the security police and the Norwegian Minister of Police, Jonas Lie. Statspolitiet also received orders directly from the Reich Security Main Office.  The general of Statspolitiet, Karl A Marthinsen was assassinated by the Norwegian resistance movement on 8 February 1945. This caused massive reprisals, in which 34 imprisoned resistance fighters were executed at Akershus Fortress.

After World War II 

After the German capitulation on May 8, 1945, Statspolitiet was disbanded immediately. Former officers of Statspolitiet were arrested and tried in Norwegian courts, and were found guilty of varying degrees of such crimes as treason, illegal detention, torture, maltreatments, murders and illegal executions. The punishments were harsh and included the use of capital punishment. The death sentences for the Statspolitiet officers Reidar Haaland, Arne Saatvedt, Hans Jacob Skaar Pedersen, Holger Tou, Ole Wehus, Olav Aspheim and Einar Dønnum were fulfilled, the officers being executed by firing squad.

Ranks and rank insignia

References 

Organisations based in Oslo
1941 establishments in Norway
1945 disestablishments in Norway
Government agencies established in 1941
Organizations disestablished in 1945
Defunct law enforcement agencies in Norway
Norway in World War II
The Holocaust in Norway
Norwegian collaborators with Nazi Germany
Government paramilitary forces